is a Japanese actress, voice actress and narrator from Ibaraki Prefecture.

Biography

Filmography

Television animation
Black Lagoon (Shenhua) 
Captain Tsubasa (Heisei era edition) (Tsubasa's mother)
Hidamari no Ki (Umika)
MÄR (Rapunzel)
Kochira Katsushika-ku Kameari Kōen-mae Hashutsujo (Ibu Honzen)
Kokoro Library (Midori Okajima)
Martial Arts Cooking Legend Bistro-Recipe (Yōen Chūnangu)
Ojarumaru (Imomushi, Ageha, housewife)
Shingu: Secret of the Stellar Wars (Kumi Isozaki)
Shrine of the Morning Mist (Yukie Uranami)
Shugo Chara! (Orie)
The Story of Saiunkoku (Rin Sai-Tei)
Street Fighter II V (Cammy)
Super Doll Licca-chan (Orie Kayama)
Soar High! Isami (Haruka Kōboku, Kanata)
Tytania (Tereeza Tytania)
You're Under Arrest Second Season (Carnaby)

OVA
Lament of the Lamb (Natsuko Eda)

Theatrical animation
Street Fighter II: The Animated Movie (Cammy)
Super Doll Licca-chan: Licca-chan Zettai Zetsumei! Doll Knights no Kiseki (Orie Kayama)

Video games
Kenka Banchō (Saki Asaoka)
Love Songs Idol Classmate (Miyu Amagi)
Suikoden V (Hasuwāru, Kisara, Suparu)

Drama
Doctor Kotō Clinic
Hi no Ryōsen
Tuesday Suspense Theater
Waterboys

External links
 

1975 births
Living people
Japanese video game actresses
Japanese voice actresses
Tokyo Actor's Consumer's Cooperative Society voice actors
Voice actresses from Ibaraki Prefecture
20th-century Japanese actresses
21st-century Japanese actresses